New generation films is a Malayalam film movement developed in the early 2010s, characterized by fresh and unusual themes and new narrative techniques. Films of the new wave differ from conventional themes of the past two decades and introduced several new trends and techniques to the Malayalam film industry. While the new generation formats and styles are deeply influenced by global trends, their thematics are firmly rooted in Malayalee life and mindscapes.

The new generation also helped to revive the Malayalam film industry in the early 2020s when the industry was hit with the effects of COVID-19 pandemic.

Beginning 
The rise of new generation movement can be traced back to the films such as Traffic (2011), City of God (2011), Salt N' Pepper (2011) and Chaappa Kurishu (2011), which helped define the movement. A few young writers and directors successfully brought new trends in fields such as acting, cinematography, editing, scripting and music; and the industry witnessed the emergence of new talent. In the beginning, most of the new wave films were modestly budgeted, thus supporting experiments by new directors, between Rs. 2 - 3 Crores (compared to the average Malayalam commercial film budget of Rs. 6 - 8 Crores) and have more than recovered their investment. 

Unlike the general trend in the Malayalam films, most of the new directors were young. Director Aashiq Abu, one of the most talked-about new generation film-makers in Malayalam, introduced several new wave films and technicians. Actor-producer Jayasurya who had debuted into the industry in 2002, had begun creating his own signature in the new-wave of cinema through phenomenal acting performances in films such as Beautiful and Trivandrum Lodge. Jayasurya had also broke the image barrier of performing in lead roles for a mainstream actor or star, by essaying several character roles and antagonist roles all which were critically acclaimed. Actor-writer Anoop Menon was another emerging personality in the beginning of New Generation Era.

Characteristics of films
Erosion of the so-called "superstar" system in popular Malayalam films coincided with rise of the new wave where screenplay got rooted-to-reality, closer-to-life and lead characters became ordinary men and women. Influx of new actors, the absence of superstars, rise of metro-centric/urban and middle-class themes and different story-lines were also noted in the wave. While formats and styles of the new directors are deeply influenced by the global trends, their thematics were firmly rooted in Malayali life and mind-scape. A recurrent trope in these new narratives is accidents, coincidences, casual encounters and chance meetings that set in motion an unexpected chain of events affecting the lives of the characters drifting in the urban flotsam. The frequent use of Malayalam influenced by English is also noted in the films.  The use of latest technology has added speed to the process of change in the industry. More advanced technology and innovative techniques are being experimented and the industry has become more open to trying out new ideas.

Until the beginning of new wave, most Malayalam films had rural themes portraying the "essential goodness" and "unspoilt beauty" of villages. The focus of the films also shifted from the conventional masculine, handsome, virtuous and invincible hero to more humane characters. Another notable feature is that stories shifted to depict more non-male characters as lead. Movies featuring gender minorities and homosexual leads is another definitive characteristic of this era of Malayalam cinema. The depiction of women has also changed in the New Wave films beyond recognition. The leading ladies often flirt openly, drink in public, and make lewd comments. A number of female-oriented films like 22 Female Kottayam, Rani Padmini, Uyare, The Great Indian Kitchen were also the part of the new wave.

Impact on superstardom 

The new wave soon ignited a debate about the era of superstars coming to an end with Malayalam cinema witnessing a radical change. In the 1980s, stars mattered, though not as much as in the 1990s and 2000s, when Malayalam cinema was practically dictated by the then superstars of the industry. The stranglehold of superstars that was stifling any new experimentation, complemented by the autocratic control of Malayalam film industry organisations over all areas of the industry was seen as pushing the industry to the wall. Unlike Mohanlal, Mammootty has done more films with directors of new wave movement, mostly being the directors' debut movie.

Notable personalities

Actors 
 Aishwarya Lekshmi
 Aju Varghese
 Alencier Ley Lopez
 Anil Nedumangad
 Anna Ben
 Ann Augustine
 Anoop Menon
 Antony Varghese
 Anumol
 Anusree
 Aparna Balamurali
 Aparna Gopinath
 Arjun Ashokan
 Asif Ali
 Balu Varghese
 Basil Joseph
 Binu Pappu
 Chemban Vinod Jose
 Darshana Rajendran
 Dhyan Sreenivasan
 Dileesh Pothan
 Dulquer Salmaan
 Fahadh Faasil
 Farhaan Faasil
 Grace Antony
 Honey Rose
 Jacob Gregory
 Jinu Joseph
 Johny Antony
 Joju George
 Kalidas Jayaram
 Kalyani Priyadarshan
 Madonna Sebastian
 Mathew Thomas
 Murali Gopy
 Muthumani
 Mythili
 Naslen K. Gafoor
 Nazriya Nazim
 Neeraj Madhav
 Nikhila Vimal
 Nimisha Sajayan
 Nithya Menen
 Nivin Pauly
 Nyla Usha
 Parvathy Thiruvothu
 Pranav Mohanlal
 Rajisha Vijayan
 Remya Nambeesan
 Renji Panicker
 Rima Kallingal
 Roshan Mathew
 Sai Pallavi
 Sajitha Madathil
 Samyuktha Menon
 Sasi Kalinga
 Shane Nigam
 Sharaf U Dheen 
 Shine Tom Chacko
 Soubin Shahir
 Sreenath Bhasi
 Srindaa
 Sudev Nair
 Sunil Sukhada
 Sunny Wayne
 Swathi Reddy
 Tovino Thomas
 Unnimaya Prasad
 Unni Mukundan
 Vijay Babu
 Vinayakan
 Vinay Forrt
 Vineeth Sreenivasan

Actors like Thilakan, Nedumudi Venu, Prithviraj Sukumaran, Jayasurya, Kunchacko Boban, Indrajith Sukumaran, Biju Menon, Indrans, Pratap Pothen, Suraj Venjarammood, Harisree Asokan, Kunchan, Lal, Saiju Kurup, Jaffar Idukki, Baburaj, Lena etc. who began their career before the new wave were also noted for their hard-hitting performances in the new generation films.

Directors 
 Aashiq Abu 
 Abrid Shine
 Alphonse Puthren 
 Amal Neerad
 Anjali Menon 
 Anwar Rasheed 
 Arun Kumar Aravind
 Ashraf Hamza
 Basil Joseph
 Dijo Jose Antony
 Dileesh Pothan
 Don Palathara
 Geetu Mohandas
 Gireesh A. D
 Jeo Baby
 Johnpaul George
 Joy Mathew 
 Khalid Rahman
 Lal Jr.
 Lijin Jose 
 Lijo Jose Pellissery
 Madhav Ramdas
 Madhu C. Narayanan
 Madhupal
 Mahesh Narayanan
 Manu Ashokan
 Midhun Manuel Thomas
 Muhammad Musthafa
 Muhsin Parari
 Rajeev Ravi
 Rajesh Pillai
 Ratheesh Balakrishnan Poduval
 Rohith V. S
 Rojin thomas
 Roopesh Peethambaran
 Sameer Thahir
 Sidharth Bharathan
 Shyju Khalid
 Soubin Shahir
 Tinu Pappachan
 V. K. Prakash
 Vinay Govind
 Vineeth Sreenivasan
 Vipin Vijay
 Salim Ahmed
 Zakariya Mohammed

Screenwriters like Syam Pushkaran, Dileesh Nair, Bobby–Sanjay, Unni R., Santhosh Echikkanam, Anjali Menon, PS Rafeeque, P. F. Mathews, S. Hareesh, Murali Gopy, Gopan Chidambaram, P. Balachandran, Shahi Kabir, Muhsin Parari; Cinematographers such as Shyju Khalid, Sameer Thahir, Madhu Neelakandan, Abinandhan Ramanujam, Jomon T. John, Renadive, Little Swayamp, Anend C. Chandran, Pappu, Shehnad Jalal, Vinod illampally; Musical Artists Bijibal, Rex Vijayan, Jakes Bejoy, Prashant Pillai, Sushin Shyam, Gopi Sundar, Rahul Raj, Shaan Rahman, Rajesh Murugesan, Shahabaz Aman, Vishnu Vijay, Justin Varghese; Editors like Vivek Harshan, B. Ajithkumar, Saiju Sreedharan, Mahesh Narayanan, Praveen Prabhakar, Manoj, Noufal Abdullah, Deepu Joseph etc. were also made significant contributions to New Wave Films.

Films widely regarded as new generation films 
The following are some of the films widely considered as new generation Malayalam films: 
 Traffic – a film that was directed by Rajesh Pillai. The success of the film gave New Generation Cinema the green signal.
 100 Days of Love
 1 by Two
 1956, Central Travancore
 1983
 22 Female Kottayam
 5 Sundarikal
 7th Day
  Aanum Pennum
 Aarkkariyam
 Action Hero Biju 
 Ajagajantharam
 Akam
 Amen
 Anarkali 
 Android Kunjappan Version 5.25
 Annayum Rasoolum
 Anugraheethan Antony
 Anuraga Karikkin Vellam
 Apothecary
 Ayalum Njanum Thammil
 Ayyappanum Koshiyum
 Bachelor Party
 Bangalore Days
 Beautiful
 Bheemante Vazhi
 Bheeshma Parvam
 Bhoothakaalam
 C U Soon
 Chappa Kurishu
Charlie
Chirakodinja Kinavukal
 Churuli
 City of God
 Da Thadiya
 Dear Friend
 Double Barrel
 Ee Adutha Kaalathu
 Ee.Ma.Yau
 Ezra
 Friday
 Godha (film)
 Guppy
 Helen
 Honey Bee 
 Hotel California
 Hridayam 
 Iblis
 Idukki Gold
 Iyobinte Pusthakam
 Jallikattu
 Jan.E.Man
 Jana Gana Mana
 Jo and Jo
 John Luther (film) 
 Joji
 Joseph
 Kala
 Kammatti Paadam
 Kanakam Kaamini Kalaham
 Kappela
 Kili Poyi
 Kumbalangi Nights
 Kunjiramayanam
 Kuttavum Shikshayum
 Lukka Chuppi
 Mahaveeryar
 Maheshinte Prathikaaram
 Malayankunju
 Mayanadi
 Mili
 Minnal Murali
 Moothon 
 Mumbai Police
 Munnariyippu
 Naaradan
 Nayattu
 Nee Ko Njaa Cha
 Neelakasham Pachakadal Chuvanna Bhoomi
 Neram
 Nidra
 Njan Steve Lopez
 Nna Thaan Case Kodu
 North 24 Kaatham
 Ohm Shanthi Oshaana
 Operation Java
 Oru Vadakkan Selfie
 Pada
 Parava
 Philips and the Monkey Pen
 Premam
 Puzhu
 Rani Padmini
 Salt N' Pepper  
 Santhoshathinte Onnam Rahasyam
 Savam
 Second Show 
 Sudani From Nigeria
 Super Sharanya
 Swathanthryam Ardharathriyil
 Take Off
 Tamaar Padaar
 Thallumaala
 Thamaasha
 Thanneer Mathan Dinangal
 Thattathin Marayathu
 Thinkalazhcha Nishchayam
 The Great Indian Kitchen
 Theevram
 Thondimuthalum Driksakshiyum
 Trance
 Trivandrum Lodge 
 Unda
 Ustad Hotel 
 Uyare
 Valiyaperunnal
 Varathan
 Vedivazhipadu
 Vettah
 Virus

General response and criticisms 
As per critics, the new wave of activity in Malayalam cinema is reminiscent of the 1980s, regarded as the golden age of Malayalam cinema, when mainstream films bridged the gap between arthouse and commercial movies, led by a team of talented writers and directors. In the 1980s, Malayalam films witnessed some positive changes through directors like Padmarajan and Bharathan, who made path-breaking films. These films too broke the norms which were considered the prerequisite for a commercial entertainer, and traversed a new path between popular and parallel cinema.

There is a general consensus that the New-Gen movies draw a lot of inspiration from other film industries. They depict lives of people living in 21st century Kerala through a very realistic lens, it's often said that most of its success is due to the freshness these narratives possess in comparison to traditional Malayalam movies. . New-Gen Malayalam movies tend to feature more nucleus families and urban lifestyle, rather than the depiction of traditional joint families from villages. This and the adult themes present in a lot of movies has gained the New-Gen movies the criticism that they're primary targeted towards young people.

The new wave films are criticized for explicit language and provocative themes, often "under the guise of bold or modern". Malayalam actor Jayaram has talked about his disinterest towards the new generation films publicly, he has heard to be saying the new wave films lacks its appeal towards a family environment as the inappropriateness of mannerisms in certain films, beyond a PG-13 is very awkward to someone who expects to watch a family film such as most of the conventional Malayalam movies were, which did not need a specific rating.

The New generation received criticism from some conventional film-makers. They accused that plagiarized versions of foreign films are being presented under the guise of New Wave experiments. While admirers of the New Wave of Malayalam films call it the "Jasmine revolution", critics refer it as the "multiplex revolution". "Some films that are fresh in thought and execution have clicked at the box office," says veteran director Sibi Malayil. "But I am against referring to them as New Wave Cinema. Changes were always there in Malayalam films. But most of these so-called new-generation movies revolve around the themes that deal with life in a metro city. These films are getting a good response in tier-I cities only".

References 

Malayalam cinema
Malayalam-language films
New Wave in cinema
Movements in cinema